Lorin Roser is a Chinese American New York–based multifaceted animator, painter, musician and multimedia artist. As an architect and artist his animation work uses "random manipulations to explore a world of hitherto unseen shapes and structural possibilities." Lorin Roser is partners with Nina Kuo.

Early life 
Roser was born on the East Coast of the United States. He studied architecture with Kenneth Frampton, Emilio Ambasz, Yoshio Taniguchi, and Craig Hodgetts at Princeton University and earned an MA at UCLA.

Career 

Roser moved to New York in the 1980s where he met artist Nina Kuo and began many artistic collaborations with her. Participating in the New York City downtown art scene, Roser has been a sought-after musician and performer since the 1980s. Roser has performed at CBGB's, Franklin Furnace, the Emily Harvey Foundation, the WhiteBox art center with Elliott Sharp, events for curator/performance artist Arleen Schloss and composed music for Verneta Nemec's performance art works. He has also written music for Larry Litt and Hector Canonge.  He participated in the "Digital Art Symposium" at Lightbox, NYC in 2019.

Besides animations and music, he also designs book covers, most recently for Digital Media: Transformations in Human Communication by Paul Messaris and Lee Humphries.

As he continues making art, Roser is moving into 3D animations, melding music and form with the digital world. He states, "Visualization is a great tool for architecture because building bricks and mortar is so expensive and computer animation mimics the unfolding of space as you walk through a building. Now I am obsessed with using math to create music and form. The computer excels at this type of exploration."

Roser's work is in the collection of many major international museums, galleries, and archives including Franklin Furnace Archives, Museum of Modern Art, Otis Art Institute, and the Chicago Art Institute Library.

Collections 
 Franklin Furnace Archives
 Museum of Modern Art
 Chicago Art Institute Library
 Otis Art Institute

Select exhibitions and performances 
 "Eastern Margins' Respect Our Elders," online, London, 2021
 “Outscape Escape,” Gallery 456 in New York City, 2021
 "Make America Great" WhiteBox, NYC, 2016
New Museum, IDEAS City, 2015
"Re-wired/Re-wired": Event for Dismembered Body, with Stelarc, PICA and online, 2015
 "Protests Performance"  Bronx Museum, NYC curated by Hector Canonge, 2015
Harvestworks, NYC  performance,  2015
 Electronica Performance with Elliott Sharp entitled  "Klang", WhiteBox art space, NYC
Bowery Poetry Club – Zen Loopology with Jason Hwang, Helen Yee, Daniel Carter, and John Marino
Flushing Town Hall – Tang Loopology

Awards 
 2014 Art Award Catalog  Sumei Multidisciplinary Art Center "Ironbound/Unbound" issue, NJ art video with Nina Kuo

References

Year of birth missing (living people)
Living people
American multimedia artists
American video artists
American male guitarists